The 2019 Big East Conference baseball tournament was held at Prasco Park in Mason, Ohio, from May 23 through 26. The event, held at the end of the conference regular season, determined the champion of the Big East Conference for the 2019 season.  The winner of the double-elimination tournament, Creighton, received the conference's automatic bid to the 2019 NCAA Division I baseball tournament.

Format and seeding
The tournament used a double-elimination format and featured the top four finishers of the Big East's seven teams.

Bracket

Conference championship

References

Tournament
Big East Conference Baseball Tournament
Big East Conference baseball tournament
Big East Conference baseball tournament
College baseball tournaments in Ohio
Sports competitions in Mason, Ohio